Carbonate Mountain, at  above sea level is a peak in the Smoky Mountains of Idaho. The peak is located on the west side of the Wood River Valley northwest of downtown Hailey in Blaine County. Much of the mountain is located on private land, but three small parcels are managed by the Bureau of Land Management.

References 

Bureau of Land Management areas in Idaho
Mountains of Blaine County, Idaho
Mountains of Idaho